Magma Aviation is a European cargo handler specialising in charter and regular cargo services. Magma Aviation runs regular B747-400F services between cargo hubs in Europe to West and South Africa, as well as to North America. Magma Aviation operates worldwide with the main office located in London, United Kingdom.

History 
2009 – Magma Aviation is founded to commercially and operationally managed dedicated wide-body cargo aircraft, contracted on an exclusive basis from airline partners.

2017 – Chapman Freeborn increases its stake in Magma Aviation to a majority shareholding of 75%. The global aircraft charter specialist has held a minority holding in Magma since the company was launched.

2019 - Chapman Freeborn acquired by Avia Solutions Group, a global aviation holding company with subsidiaries engaged in aircraft maintenance, pilot training, ground handling and fuelling, aviation IT solutions, and business aviation.

Services 
Magma Aviation provides charter and regular cargo services on its operationally-managed fleet of B747-400Fs on behalf of global clients.

Industries covered include:

 Automotive
 Dangerous Goods
 Heavy & Outsize
 Humanitarian
 Live Animals (AVI)
 Oil & Gas

Magma Aviation also specialises in the air transportation of perishable goods such as fresh flowers, exotic fruit, and vegetables.

Fleet 
As of 2021 Magma Aviation operates the following aircraft:

References 

2009 establishments in England
Airlines established in 2009
British companies established in 2009